The 1935 Stanford Indians football team represented Stanford University in the 1935 college football season. In head coach Tiny Thornhill's third season, the team was Pacific Coast Conference co-champions with one loss, allowing opponents to score just 13 points all season.

Each of the three co-champions had one loss to one of the other co-champions: Stanford to UCLA, UCLA to California, and California to Stanford. With Stanford's shutout of California in the last game of the season, Stanford was selected to represent the conference in the Rose Bowl against undefeated and number-one ranked SMU. This marked Stanford's third consecutive Rose Bowl appearance, and the team had lost the previous two appearances. Against heavily favored SMU, Stanford pulled off a 7–0 upset, the team's second Rose Bowl victory.

Schedule

Players drafted by the NFL

References

Stanford
Stanford Cardinal football seasons
Pac-12 Conference football champion seasons
Rose Bowl champion seasons
Stanford Indians football